Dorcas Wright "Dede" Gardner is an American film producer. She was president since the founding, and then co-president since 2013 of Plan B Entertainment. She is a two-time Oscar winner for 12 Years a Slave and Moonlight, the first woman to win two Oscars for Best Picture. Her films Selma, The Tree of Life, The Big Short, Vice, Minari and Women Talking were additionally nominated for the Academy Award for Best Picture.

Biography
Gardner received her BA in English from Columbia University and MFA from California Institute of the Arts.

Filmography
She was a producer in all films unless otherwise noted.

Film

Location Manager

Thanks

Television

Awards and nominations

In 2012, Gardner and her fellow producers were nominated for the Academy Award for Best Picture for The Tree of Life. In 2014, she won the Academy Award for Best Picture for the movie 12 Years a Slave alongside co-producers Brad Pitt, Steve McQueen,  Jeremy Kleiner and Anthony Katagas. In 2015, she was nominated once again for the Academy Award for Best Picture for producing Selma alongside fellow producers Oprah Winfrey, Jeremy Kleiner, and Christian Colson. In 2017, she won her second Academy Award for Best Picture for the movie, Moonlight. She becomes the first female producer to win two Academy Awards for Best Picture.

Academy Awards

AACTA International Awards

AFI Awards

Alliance of Women Film Journalists

American Black Film Festival

Awards Circuit Community Awards

Black Reel Awards

British Academy Film Awards

CinEuphoria Awards

Golden Raspberry Awards

Gotham Awards

Independent Spirit Awards

Italian Online Movie Awards

Online Film & Television Association Awards

Primetime Emmy Awards

Producers Guild of America Awards

References

External links

Living people
Filmmakers who won the Best Film BAFTA Award
Golden Globe Award-winning producers
People from Chicago
Producers who won the Best Picture Academy Award
American women film producers
Columbia College (New York) alumni
21st-century American women
Year of birth missing (living people)
Film producers from Illinois
California Institute of the Arts alumni